Valvatoidea is a superfamily of minute freshwater and marine snails, aquatic gastropod mollusks in the informal group Lower Heterobranchia.

Taxonomy
Family Valvatidae
Family Cornirostridae
Family Hyalogyrinidae
 † Family Provalvatidae

References 

Lower Heterobranchia
Taxa named by John Edward Gray